The nasolabial folds, commonly known as "smile lines" or "laugh lines", are facial features. They are the two skin folds that run from each side of the nose to the corners of the mouth. They are defined by facial structures that support the buccal fat pad. They separate the cheeks from the upper lip. The term derives from Latin nasus for "nose" and labium for "lip".
Nasolabial fold is a misnomer, however. The proper anatomical term is melolabial fold, meaning the fold between the cheek and lip.

Cosmetology issues
With ageing the fold may grow in length and depth. Dermal fillings may be used to replace lost fats and collagen in this facial area. Facial exercises give effective results in erasing the appearance of nasolabial folds.

See also
Epicanthal fold
Nasalis muscle

References

Facial features
Cosmetics
Skin anatomy